Slobozhanske is an urban-type settlement in Krasnohrad Raion of Kharkiv Oblast in Ukraine. Slobozhanske belongs to Kehychivka settlement hromada, one of the hromadas of Ukraine. Population: 

The settlement was called Chapaeve until 2016, in honour of Vasily Chapayev. On 5 February 2016, Verkhovna Rada adopted decision to rename Chapaeve to Slobozhanske according to the law prohibiting names of Communist origin. 

Until 18 July 2020, Slobozhanske belonged to Kehychivka Raion. The raion was abolished in July 2020 as part of the administrative reform of Ukraine, which reduced the number of raions of Kharkiv Oblast to seven. The area of Kechyhivka Raion was merged into Krasnohrad Raion.

Economy

Transportation
Slobozhanske is connected with Kehychivka by a railroad, but this is a cargo line without any passenger traffic. The closest station with passenger navigation is in Kehychivka.

The settlement is connected by road with Kehychivka in the south and Nova Vodolaha in the north.

References

Urban-type settlements in Krasnohrad Raion